Laksar is a small town, near Haridwar city and Nagar Palika in Haridwar district of the Indian state of Uttarakhand, situated along National Highway 334A.  It is an important sugar manufacturing destination in the state and also known for the Laksar Junction railway station (LRJ), the largest railway junction in the state, which was built in 1866.

Geography
Laksar has an average elevation of 227 metres (745 feet). It is situated between the towns of Khanpur and Sultanpur, and close to the towns of Pathri, Jhabrera and Roorkee in Haridwar district.

MLA (Member of Legislative Assembly)
The area around Laksar is dominated by the Gurjar,Hindu community, and the current MLA is Sehjad. Prior MLAs serving Laksar were as follows:
 1991: Tejpal Singh Panwar , Bharatiya Janata Party
 1993: Tejpal Singh Panwar , Bharatiya Janata Party
 1996: Mohammad Mohiuddin,  (politician)
 2002: Pranav Singh Gurjar(present descendant of Landhora state), Independent
 2007: Pranav Singh Gurjar(present descendant of Landhora state), Indian National Congress
 2012: Sanjay Gupta, Bharatiya Janata Party
 2017: Sanjay Gupta, Bharatiya Janata Party

Demographics
As of the 2001 India census, Laksar had a population of 18,240. Males constituted 54% of the population and females 46%. Laksar had an average literacy rate of 68%, higher than the national average of 59.5%: male literacy was listed at 75%, and female literacy at 59%. In Laksar, 15% of the population is under 6 years of age.

Transport
Laksar is well connected by road with Haridwar, Saharanpur, and Roorkee cities, and Laksar Junction railway station lies within the city. It was first connected with city of Haridwar through branch line in 1886, when the Awadh and Rohilakhand Railway line was extended through Roorkee to Saharanpur, this was later extended to Dehradun in 1900.

The nearest airport is Jolly Grant Airport, Dehradun, though Indira Gandhi International Airport in New Delhi is preferred.

Local administration
Today, Laksar is one of the four tehsils in the Haridwar district, and one of its six development blocks.

Nagar Palika elections were held in Laksar for the first time in 1995. The current MLA of Laksar is Shri Sanjay Gupta, in his first tenure from the Laksar region.

References

External links
 Official website of Laksar city
 Laksar at wikimapia.
 Laksar weather

Cities and towns in Haridwar district